The little black ant (Monomorium minimum) is a species of ant native to North America. It is a shiny black color, the workers about 1 to 2 mm long and the queens 4 to 5 mm long. It is a monomorphic species, with only one caste of worker, and polygyne, meaning a nest may have more than one queen. A colony is usually moderately sized with only a few thousand workers.

Monomorium minimum are scavengers that will consume anything from bird droppings to dead insects. They are predators of codling moth larvae, and also of fall webworm. Workers may forage in households, but nest in soil mounds. They harvest the honeydew of aphids such as the soybean aphid (Aphis glycines).

During mid-summer the queens and males perform the nuptial flight, mating in midair. The males die shortly after. Each queen constructs a new nest, sheds its wings, and lays eggs. The development from egg to adult takes about a month.

In a laboratory setting queens were found to live about one year and workers about four months.

References

External links

Proceedings of the Entomological Society of Washington vol. 14-15. Entomological Society of Washington, 1913. pg 70.
Monomorium minimum, the little black ant. The Ants of the Santa Barbara Museum of Natural History.
Little Black Ant, Monomorium minimum. Center for Urban & Structural Entomology. Texas A&M University Agrilife Extension. 2010.

Monomorium
Hymenoptera of North America
Insects described in 1866